McBride plc is a leading British-based manufacturing business, noted as being Europe's biggest maker of retailer own brand household goods.  The business also provides contract manufacturing for brand owners.  It is listed on the London Stock Exchange and is a constituent of the FTSE SmallCap Index.

History
The Company was founded by Robert McBride in Manchester in 1927 to make chemical process products. It was first listed on the London Stock Exchange in 1973. In 1978 it was acquired by BP.  In 1993 BP sold the Company to a group of private equity investors, with business floated in 1995 on the London Stock Exchange. In 2017 the business acquired Danlind a/s, a Danish-based auto dishwash and laundry powder manufacturer. The group announced the sale of its skincare business in the Czech Republic and the sale of its European Personal Care Liquids division factories in Bradford and Ypres in 2018. The group has grown through organic growth and acquisition to reach sales of over £700m. The company has over 18 manufacturing operations in 10 countries; UK, Belgium, France, Denmark, Italy, Luxembourg, Spain, Poland in Europe, and Malaysia and Vietnam in Asia.

Operations
The Group is organised into three divisions: UK, WCE (Western Continental Europe), and CEE (Central and Eastern Europe). 

McBride also has a small developing business in Asia following the acquisition of Fortlab.

At a glance
The Group is organised into product divisions: Powders,Aerosols&Asia Pacific;Unit Dosing and Liquids.

McBride also has a small developing business in Asia following the acquisition of Fortlab.

See also
The McBride Company, an American architectural design firm

References

External links
Official site
Yahoo profile

Manufacturing companies based in London
Manufacturing companies established in 1927
1927 establishments in England
Private equity portfolio companies
Companies listed on the London Stock Exchange